"Rain" is the second song released by Australian Idol series two runner-up Anthony Callea. The song appears on his self-titled debut album, Anthony Callea (2005). It was released as a double A-side with his recording of Simon & Garfunkel's song "Bridge over Troubled Water", which he performed on Australian Idol.

The CD single for the song was released as a three-track standard version with the B-side "Don't Tell Me". It was also available for a short time as a limited edition collector's 2CD tri-gatefold set with a second B-side, "Wanna Be the One". Upon the song's release on 14 March 2005, "Rain" / "Bridge over Troubled Water" became Callea's second number-one single on the Australian Singles Chart

Track listings
Australian CD single
 "Rain"
 "Bridge over Troubled Water"
 "Don't Tell Me"

Australian 2-CD single
1-1. "Rain"
1-2. "Wanna Be the One"
2-1. "Bridge over Troubled Water"
2-2. "Don't Tell Me"

Charts

Weekly charts

Year-end charts

Certifications

Ola Svensson version

In early 2006, Swedish singer Ola Svensson covered the song and released it as his debut single. Following his participation in Idol 2005, the single debuted at number one on the Swedish Singles Chart and remained there for three consecutive weeks.

Track listing
 "Rain" – 3:38
 "Rain" (Instrumental) – 3:47

Charts

References

2005 singles
2005 songs
Anthony Callea songs
Australian pop songs
Number-one singles in Australia
Number-one singles in Sweden
Ola Svensson songs
Songs written by Andreas Romdhane
Songs written by Josef Larossi
Songs written by Savan Kotecha
Sony BMG singles